Phoenicianism is a form of Lebanese nationalism adopted by a section of Lebanese people, at the time of the creation of Greater Lebanon. It constitutes identification of the Lebanese people with the ancient Phoenicians.

Position

Proponents claim that the land of Lebanon has been inhabited uninterruptedly since Phoenician times, and that the current population descends from the original population, with some admixture due to immigration over the centuries. They argue that Arabization merely represented a shift to the Arabic language as the vernacular of the Lebanese people, and that, according to them, no actual shift of ethnic identity, much less ancestral origins, occurred. In light of this "old controversy about identity", some Lebanese prefer to see Lebanon, Lebanese culture and themselves as part of "Mediterranean" and "Canaanite" civilization, in a concession to Lebanon's various layers of heritage, both indigenous, foreign non-Arab, and Arab. Some consider addressing all Lebanese as Arabs somewhat insensitive and prefer to call them Lebanese as a sign of respect of Lebanon's long non-Arabic past.

Language

Arabic

The Arabic language is considered to exist in multiple forms: formal Arabic, commonly known as Modern Standard Arabic (a modern incarnation of Koranic or Classical Arabic), which is used in written documents and formal contexts; and dialectal variants, numbering some thirty vernacular speech forms, used in day-to-day contexts, and varying widely from country to country. The one spoken in Lebanon is called "Lebanese Arabic" or simply "Lebanese", and it is a type of Levantine Arabic, which, together with Mesopotamian Arabic, is classed by matter of convenience as a type of Northern Arabic.

The point of controversy between Phoenicianists and their opponents lies in whether the differences between the Arabic varieties are sufficient to consider them separate languages. The former cite Prof. Wheeler Thackston of Harvard: "the languages the 'Arabs' grow up speaking at home, are as different from each other and from Arabic itself, as Latin is different from English."

There is a lack of consensus on the distinction between lingual taxa such as languages and dialects. A neutral term in linguistics is "language variety" (a.k.a. "lect"), which can be anything from a language or a family of languages to a dialect or a continuum of dialects, and beyond. The most common, and most purely linguistic, criterion is that of mutual intelligibility: two varieties are said to be dialects of the same language if being a speaker of one variety confers sufficient knowledge to understand and be understood by a speaker of the other; otherwise, they are said to be different languages. By this criterion, the variety commonly known as the Arabic language is indeed considered by linguists to be not a single language but a family of several languages, each with its own dialects. For political reasons, it is common in the Arabic-speaking world (a.k.a. the Arab world) for speakers of different Arabic varieties to assert that they all speak a single language, despite significant issues of mutual incomprehensibility among differing spoken versions.

Aramaic language

For nearly a thousand years before the spread of the Arab-Muslim conquests in the 7th century AD, Aramaic was the lingua franca and main spoken language in the Fertile Crescent. Among the Maronites, traditionally, Western Aramaic had been the spoken language up to the 17th century, when Arabic took its place, while classical Syriac remained in use only for liturgical purposes, as a sacred language (also considered as such in Judaism, alongside Hebrew).

Today the vast majority of people in Lebanon speak Lebanese Arabic as their first language. More recently, some effort has been put into revitalizing the Western Neo-Aramaic as an everyday spoken language in some ethnic Lebanese communities. Also, the modern type of Eastern Neo-Aramaic has an estimated 2–5 million speakers, mainly among Assyrians, an ethnic group related to but distinct from the Maronites of Lebanon.

Genetics 
According to genetic studies performed on the Lebanese populace, the Lebanese people share more than 90% of their genetic makeup with the ancient Canaanites who lived 3,700 years ago.

Religion

Proponents of Phoenician continuity among Maronite Christians point out that a Phoenician identity, including the worship of pre-Christian Phoenician gods such as El, Baal, Astarte and Adon was still in evidence until the mid 6th century AD in Roman Phoenice, and was only gradually replaced by Christianity during the 4th and 5th centuries AD. Furthermore, that all this happened centuries before the Arab-Islamic Conquest.

Representation in the government
Among political parties professing Phoenicianism is the Kataeb Party, a Lebanese nationalist party in the March 14 Alliance. It is officially secular, but its electorate is primarily Christian. Other political parties which profess Phoenicianism include the National Liberal Party and the Lebanese Forces.

Criticism

Josephine Quinn, associate professor in ancient history at Worcester College, University of Oxford, writes that:

Geographer and historian Jack Keilo criticized Phoenicianist claims as anachronistic, noting that "Phoenicians" and "Phoenicia" only existed in the Greek context and under the Roman Empire.

Lebanese academic As'ad AbuKhalil writes that:

Abukhalil concludes that:

The Dutch university professor Leonard C. Biegel, in his 1972 book Minorities in the Middle East: Their significance as political factor in the Arab World, coined the term Neo-Shu'ubiyya to name the modern attempts of alternative non-Arab nationalisms in the Middle East, e.g. Aramaeanism, Assyrianism, Greater Syrian nationalism, Kurdish nationalism, Berberism, Pharaonism, Phoenicianism.

Historian Kamal Salibi, a Lebanese Protestant Christian, says: "between ancient Phoenicia and the Lebanon of medieval and modern times, there is no demonstrable historical connection". ".

The earliest sense of a modern Lebanese identity is to be found in the writings of historians in the early nineteenth century, when, under the emirate of the Shihabs, a Lebanese identity emerged, "separate and distinct from the rest of Syria, bringing the Maronites and Druzes, along with its other Christian and Muslim sects, under one government." The first coherent history of Mount Lebanon was written by Tannus al-Shidyaq (died 1861) who depicted the country as a feudal association of Maronites, Druzes, Melkites, Sunnis and Shi'ites under the leadership of the Druze Ma'n dynasty and later the Sunni/Maronite Shihab emirs. "Most Christian Lebanese, anxious to dissociate themselves from Arabism and its Islamic connections, were pleased to be told that their country was the legitimate heir to the Phoenician tradition," Kamal Salibi observes, instancing Christian writers like Charles Corm (died 1963), writing in French, and Said Aql, who urged the abandonment of Literary Arabic, together with its script, and attempted to write in the Lebanese vernacular, using the Roman alphabet.

Phoenician origins have additional appeal for the Christian middle class, as it presents the Phoenicians as traders, and the Lebanese emigrant as a modern-day Phoenician adventurer, whereas for the Muslim population it merely veiled French imperialist ambitions, intent on subverting pan-Arabism. Historian Fawwaz Traboulsi sees Phoenicianism as a tool which only served the economic and political interests of Maronite elites.

Many scholars and historians, including as Kamal Salibi, Albert Hourani and Amin Al-Rihani, have criticized Phoenicianism for historical inaccuracies.

Historian Rola El-Husseini sees Phoenicianism as an origin myth; others note how it disregards the Arab cultural and linguistic influence on the Lebanese. They ascribe Phoenicianism to sectarian influences on Lebanese culture and the attempt by Lebanese Maronites to distance themselves from Arab culture and traditions.

As summed by As'ad AbuKhalil, Historical Dictionary of Lebanon (London: Scarecrow Press), 1998:
Ethnically speaking, the Lebanese are indistinguishable from the peoples of the eastern Mediterranean. They are undoubtedly a mixed population, reflecting centuries of population movement and foreign occupation... While Arabness is not an ethnicity but a cultural identity, some ardent Arab nationalists, in Lebanon and elsewhere, talk about Arabness in racial and ethnic terms to elevate the descendants of Muhammad. Paradoxically, Lebanese nationalists also speak about the Lebanese people in racial terms, claiming that the Lebanese are "pure" descendants of the Phoenician peoples, whom they view as separate from the ancient residents of the region, including — ironically — the Canaanites. 

Recent studies by Miriam Balmuth has also shown that a large part of Phoenicians' history has been influenced by political ideologies that started with the Greeks and the Romans and that the Phoenicians did not have a shared Phoenician identity which they identified with, choosing to identify with their city of origins such as Tyre and Sidon. They did however share a common language, common religious practices, ethnic origin and a common maritime trade culture.

See also
 
Aramaeanism
Assyrianism
Berberism
Canaanism
Kataeb Party
Lebanese nationalism
Maronites
Names of Syriac Christians
Pan-Arabism
Pharaonism
Phoenicia
Kurdish nationalism

Notes

Further reading
Kaufman, Asher, "Phoenicianism: The Formation of an Identity in Lebanon in 1920" Middle Eastern Studies, (January, 2001)

Plonka Arkadiusz, L’idée de langue libanaise d’après Sa‘īd ‘Aql, Paris, Geuthner, 2004 (French)  
Plonka Arkadiusz, "Le nationalisme linguistique au Liban autour de Sa‘īd ‘Aql et l’idée de langue libanaise dans la revue «Lebnaan» en nouvel alphabet", Arabica, 53 (4), 2006, pp. 423–471. (French)
Salameh, Franck, Language Memory and Identity in the Middle East; The Case for Lebanon, Lanham, MD, Lexington Books, 2010, 
Salameh, Franck, Charles Corm; An Intellectual Biography of a Twentieth-Century Lebanese "Young Phoenician", Lanham, MD, Lexington Books, 2015,

External links
National Geographic: "Who Were the Phoenicians?"
National Geographic: "In the Wake of the Phoenicians:DNA study reveals a Phoenician-Maltese link"
The Irish Lebanese Cultural Foundation: "A parallel in History between Lebanon and Ireland"